Saidpur Behta is a village in Bachhrawan block of Rae Bareli district, Uttar Pradesh, India. As of 2011, its population is 612, in 118households. It historically belonged to the taluqdars of Tirbediganj.

The 1961 census recorded Saidpur Behta as comprising 1 hamlet, with a total population of 220 people (145 male and 115 female ), in 50 households and 43 physical houses. The area of the village was given as 244 acres.

The 1981 census recorded Saidpur Behta as having a population of 355 people, in 64 households, and having an area of 100.77 hectares.

References

Villages in Raebareli district